Portugal was represented at the 2009 World Championships in Athletics, held in Berlin from August 15 to August 23, with a delegation of 30 athletes (17 men and 13 women). This delegation matched the record for the biggest national team at the World Championships in Athletics, set at Athens 1997. 
The team included reigning Olympic and 2007 world triple jump champion Nelson Évora, reigning world indoor champion in the long jump Naide Gomes, and Olympic and World Championships medalist Rui Silva. Veteran race walker and 2005 bronze medalist Susana Feitor accomplished her 10th consecutive appearance at the World Championships. Francis Obikwelu came out of retirement to compete with the 4 × 100 metres relay team.

Results

Men
Track and road events

Field and combined events

Women
Track and road events

Field and combined events

References

External links
Official competition website
Federação Portuguesa de Atletismo 

Nations at the 2009 World Championships in Athletics
2009
World Championships in Athletics